Klaus Zerta (born 25 November 1946) is a retired German rowing coxswain. He was part of the West German team that won gold medals at the 1960 Summer Olympics in the coxed pair event competing for the United Team of Germany. Zerta was the youngest medalist at the 1960 Games. He is the youngest confirmed male gold medalist in Olympic history. He was 13 years and 283 days when he won the gold in the men's coxed pair in 1960.

References

1946 births
Living people
Coxswains (rowing)
Olympic rowers of the United Team of Germany
Rowers at the 1960 Summer Olympics
Olympic gold medalists for the United Team of Germany
Sportspeople from Gelsenkirchen
Olympic medalists in rowing
West German male rowers
Medalists at the 1960 Summer Olympics